Kiefel is a surname. Notable people with the surname include:

 Josef Kiefel (1908–1999), anti-Nazi and East German counterintelligence chief
 Ron Kiefel (born 1960), American cyclist
 Russell Kiefel (1951–2016), Australian actor
 Susan Kiefel (born 1954), Australian jurist

See also
 Kiefer